Jernegan is a surname. Notable people with the surname include:

 Helen Jernegan (1839–1934), American woman and wife of a whaler
 John D. Jernegan (1911–1981), American Career Foreign Service Officer
 Marcus Jernegan (1872–1949), American historian and a professor at the University of Chicago